This is a list of Mexican football clubs in international competitions. Mexican clubs have participated in competitive international soccer competitions since at least 1963 for the first CONCACAF Champions' Cup.

Mexican teams have traditionally dominated the CONCACAF Champions League tournament, winning 37 of the 57 tournaments. Additionally, Mexican clubs have won 3 of the 4 North American SuperLigas. Mexican clubs have also participated in the CONMEBOL's Copa Sudamericana, where Pachuca won the title in 2006.

Since 1963, Mexican football clubs have won 37 CONCACAF Champions' Cup/Champions League titles, and finished runners-up 20 times.

Who qualifies for CONCACAF competitions 
For the CONCACAF Champions League, four Mexican football clubs are eligible for entry into the competition.

 Apertura winners and runners-up
 Clasura winners and runners-up

Cups and finals

FIFA Club World Championship / Club World Cup

Copa Interamericana (defunct)

CONCACAF Champions' Cup / Champions League

North American SuperLiga (defunct)

CONCACAF Cup Winners Cup / Giants Cup (defunct)

Leagues Cup

Copa Libertadores

Copa Sudamericana

Full international record

FIFA Club World Championship / FIFA Club World Cup

Copa Interamericana (defunct)

CONCACAF Champions' Cup / Champions League

Leagues Cup

North American SuperLiga (defunct)

Campeones Cup

CONCACAF Cup Winners Cup / Giants Cup (defunct)

Copa Libertadores 

Mexican football clubs did not partake in the Copa Libertadores until 1998. Mexican clubs stopped playing in 2016 due to schedule conflicts.

Copa Sudamericana 

Mexican football clubs took part in the Copa Sudamericana from 2005 until 2008.

Notes

References

External links 
 RSSSF International Club Results for North America

 
North American football clubs in international competitions